The 2012 ARCA Racing Series presented by Menards was the 60th season of the ARCA Racing Series. The season began on February 18 with the Lucas Oil Slick Mist 200 and ended on October 19 with the Kansas ARCA 150. Chris Buescher won the championship over Frank Kimmel by 75 points after a heated battle. Alex Bowman was named Rookie of the Year after battling Brennan Poole all season.

Teams and drivers

Complete schedule

Limited schedule

Notes

Schedule
The 2012 series schedule was announced in November 2011.

Results and standings

Races

Drivers' championship
(key) Bold – Pole position awarded by time. Italics – Pole position set by final practice results or rainout. * – Most laps led. ** – All laps led.

See also
 2012 NASCAR Sprint Cup Series
 2012 NASCAR Nationwide Series
 2012 NASCAR Camping World Truck Series
 2012 NASCAR K&N Pro Series East
 2012 NASCAR Canadian Tire Series
 2012 NASCAR Toyota Series
 2012 NASCAR Stock V6 Series
 2012 Racecar Euro Series

References

External links
 

ARCA
ARCA Menards Series seasons